The 2009–10 UC Irvine Anteaters men's basketball team represented the University of California, Irvine during the 2009–10 NCAA Division I men's basketball season. The Anteaters were led by 13th year head coach Pat Douglass and played at the Bren Events Center. They were members of the Big West Conference. At the end of the season, head coach Pat Douglass did not have his contract renewed.

Previous season 
The 2008–09 UC Irvine Anteaters men's basketball team finished the season with a record of 12–19 and 8–8 in Big West play.

Roster

Schedule

|-
!colspan=9 style=|Regular Season

|-
!colspan=9 style=| Big West tournament

Awards and honors
Eric Wise 
All-Big West Second Team

References

UC Irvine Anteaters men's basketball seasons
UC Irvine
UC Irvine Anteaters
UC Irvine Anteaters